Vengeance Is My Forgiveness (also known as Shotgun) is a 1968 Italian Spaghetti Western film written and directed by Roberto Mauri.

Plot

Cast 

 Tab Hunter as Sheriff Durango
 Erika Blanc as  Jane
 Piero Lulli as  John Kindar
 Mimmo Palmara as  Jack Quartz 
 Daniele Vargas as  Dr. Frank Decker
 Renato Romano as  Fred Madigan
 Ugo Sasso as  McLaine
 Alfredo Rizzo as  Pete, the Pianist
 Dada Gallotti as  Lucy McLaine
 Osiride Pevarello as  Juan
 Solvejg D'Assunta as Durango's Mother

References

External links

Vengeance Is My Forgiveness at Variety Distribution

Spaghetti Western films
1968 Western (genre) films
1968 films
Films directed by Roberto Mauri
1960s Italian-language films
1960s Italian films